Considered a ghost town, Dewright was seven miles southeast of Maud, Oklahoma in Seminole County, Oklahoma.  Its post office was opened June 24, 1931 and closed November 30, 1939.  The settlement was named for Dewey Wright, its first postmaster.

References

Unincorporated communities in Seminole County, Oklahoma
Unincorporated communities in Oklahoma